Nicola Willis may refer to:

 Nicola Willis (politician) (born 1981), New Zealand
 Nicola Willis (gymnast) (born 1985), England